Horace Bullard (1938-2013) was an entrepreneur who founded the New York City based Kansas Fried Chicken chain, and later acquired properties in an ambitious proposal to revitalize Coney Island.

Business ventures
Bullard started Kansas Fried Chicken, named after Max's Kansas City, when he was unable to secure a Kentucky Fried Chicken franchise. Bullard was from East Harlem, and of African American and Puerto Rican heritage, and infused flavors from these communities. The successful franchise eventually closed, though it has a legacy in the many unaffiliated Kennedy Fried Chicken restaurants that grew up afterward, largely started by people in the Afghan American community.

Bullard used some of his restaurant profits to accumulate properties in Coney Island, with an aim of reviving its amusement industry. He bought the Shore Theater and the Thunderbolt, and developed a plan for a new Steeplechase Park in 1985 that was initially projected to cost $55 million, and that earned the support of the Ed Koch administration. The succeeding Giuliani Administration was less supportive, and pushed the old Steeplechase site to be a minor league baseball stadium, which is known today as Maimonides Park. Giuliani also controversially ordered the demolition of the Thunderbolt without notice to its owner Bullard.

References

External links 
 Interview with Ita Bullard - wife of Horace - conducted by the Coney Island History Project

1938 births
2013 deaths
African-American businesspeople
American chief executives of food industry companies
American entertainment industry businesspeople
American people of Puerto Rican descent
American real estate businesspeople
American restaurateurs
Burials at Woodlawn Cemetery (Bronx, New York)
Businesspeople from New York City
Fast-food chain founders
People from East Harlem
20th-century African-American people
21st-century African-American people